Claus Dascher "Babe" Benson (November 15, 1889 – ?) was an American basketball player known for his collegiate career at Columbia University in the 1910s. He led the Lions to back-to-back Eastern Intercollegiate Basketball League (EIBL) championships in 1910–11 and 1911–12 and was named all-conference both seasons. As a senior in 1911–12 Benson was named an NCAA All-American by the Helms Athletic Foundation.

Benson served in World War I and returned to his alma mater to coach Columbia for one season (1919–20). He recorded a 4–10 overall record. Benson also served as an assistant coach at Army after Columbia.

References

1889 births
Year of death uncertain
All-American college men's basketball players
American men's basketball players
American military personnel of World War I
Army Black Knights men's basketball coaches
Basketball coaches from New York (state)
Basketball players from New York City
Columbia Lions men's basketball coaches
Columbia Lions men's basketball players
Guards (basketball)